The El Dorado Commercial Historic District encompasses the historic commercial heart of downtown El Dorado, Arkansas.  The city serves as the seat of Union County, and experienced a significant boom in growth during the 1920s, after oil was discovered in the area.  The business district that grew in this time is anchored by the Union County Courthouse, at the corner of Main and Washington Streets, where the Confederate memorial is also located.  The historic district listed on the National Register of Historic Places in 2003 includes the city blocks surrounding the courthouse, as well as several blocks extending east along Main Street and south along Washington Street.  Most of the commercial buildings are one and two stories in height and are built of brick.  Notable exceptions include the Exchange Bank building, which was, at nine stories, the county's first skyscraper, and the eight-story Murphy Oil building.  There are more than forty contributing properties in the district.

See also
National Register of Historic Places listings in Union County, Arkansas

References

Colonial Revival architecture in Arkansas
Buildings and structures in El Dorado, Arkansas
Buildings designated early commercial in the National Register of Historic Places in Arkansas
Historic districts on the National Register of Historic Places in Arkansas
National Register of Historic Places in Union County, Arkansas